Charmaine Munroe (born 12 January 1971), known professionally as Macka Diamond, is a Jamaican recording artist, singer, songwriter and actress. She was born in Kingston and raised in Portmore. Early in her career during the 1990s, she was known by the stage names Lady Charm, Lady Worries and Lady Mackerel. She was influenced by female artists such as Sister Nancy, Lady Ann, Lady Junie and Lady G, who were big at that time. With Junie's help, she got the chance to record "Don Girl". After a string of singles, including collaborations with Captain Barkey and Wickerman, she changed her name to Macka Diamond with her 2003 single "Tek Con", a protest record to Vybz Kartel's chauvinistic track "Tek Buddy".

On 7 February 2012, she released the album Don't Disturb Mi, under Money Ooh Productions/VPAL. 

Macka is performing the role of Kim, a nurse for a patient with dementia, in the upcoming film “3 to 11” written by Summer Angel, set to premier February 5th, 2022.

Discography

Albums

Money-O (LP, album, 2006), Greensleeves Records
Don't Disturb Mi (2012), Money Ooh Productions/VPAL

Singles
"Tekk Con" (7",2003), G-String Production	
"Capleton / Macka Diamond – Mi Ready?" (2 versions, (2004), Big Jeans Records
"Mi Ready" (7", 2004), Big Jeans Records
"Macka Diamond / Danny English – Move Up Time / Nah Fight" (7", (2004), Juke Boxx Productions
"Move Up Time / Nah Fight" (7", 2004), Juke Boxx Productions
"Chase Money" (7", 2004), Mad House
"Macka Diamond / Kip Rich* – Mr. Tecki Back / Baby Song" (7", 2004), Echo (2)
"Done Already" (7", 2004), Echo (2)
"Makka Diamond* / Chico (2) – Buddy / Never Yet" (7", 2004), Champagne International Records
"Macka Diamond / Round Head – Try Wid Him / U Man Want Yu" (7", 2004), Don Corleon Records
"Macka Diamond / Danny English – Stop Watch Me / All About Us" (7", single, 2004), Big Yard Music Group Ltd., Big Yard Music Group Ltd.
"Blacker Ranks* / Macka Diamond – Your Life / Know Yu Fren" (7", 2004), Kings of Kings
"Mr.Tecki Black / Military Riddim" (7", 2004), Birchill Records
"Macka Diamond / Rdx – Comfortable / Get Krunk" (7", 2005), FIP Records
"Gregory Isaacs & Macka Diamond – Number One" (7", 2005), Ball A Fire Muzik
"Macka Diamond & Marlene (5) / Lady Empress – Money Oh / Bashment Girl" (7", 2005), South Rakkas Crew
"Makka Diamond* & Vybz Kartel – Look Big" (7", 2005), Don Corleon Records
"Hoolla Hoop" (2 versions, 2006), 	Hands & Heart
"Hoolla Hoop" (7", 2006), Hands & Heart
"Hoola Hoop" (12", promo, S/Sided, Red, 2007), Greensleeves Records
"Angel (53) / Macka Diamond – Good Girl / Independent" (7", 2006), Reggae Republic
"Gangster Wife" (7", 2007), Juke Boxx Productions
"Macka Diamond / Zumjay – Nuff Cash / Pimpers Paradise" (7", 2007), Gravi-T Music
"Queen Paula / Macka Diamond – Nuff Gal A Sleep Outa Road 2nite" (7", 2007), Blaque Warriahz Muzik
"Money Money" (7", 2008), 	M Bass Productions
"Makka Diamond* / Timberly – Dem A Talk / Matey" (7", 2008), Jam II Records
"Mykal Rose* Feat. Mitch (3) & Cali P* / Macka Diamond – Mr. Collie (Rmx) / We're Flossing" (7", 2009), Food Palace Music
"Mykal Rose* Feat. Mitch (3) & Cali P* / Macka Diamond – Mr. Collie (Rmx) / We're Flossing" (7", 2009), Food Palace Music

Books
The Real Gangster Wife
Bun Him
Naughty or Nice?
Grown and Sexy

References

Jamaican dancehall musicians
Jamaican reggae musicians
Living people
Musicians from Kingston, Jamaica
1973 births
21st-century Jamaican women singers
20th-century Jamaican women singers